NCAA Division III women's ice hockey is a college ice hockey competition governed by the National Collegiate Athletic Association (NCAA) as part of the NCAA Division III (DIII or D3). Sixty-seven teams competed in NCAA Division III women’s hockey across eight conferences in the 2019–20 season.

Conferences
Conference affiliations and the conferences themselves experienced numerous changes in the later part of the 2010s. The most substantial alterations occurred with the founding of the Colonial Hockey Conference (CHC) in 2015 and the folding of ECAC West in 2017, which precipitated the creation of the Northeast Women's Hockey League (NEWHL) in the same year. The conferences and affiliations presented below are accurate through the 2019–20 season.

A conference with seven or more affiliated programs automatically qualifies for the NCAA DIII Women's Ice Hockey Tournament. In practice, the Colonial Hockey Conference (CHC) and the Wisconsin Intercollegiate Athletic Conference (WIAC) are the only conferences that do not receive automatic bids for the tournament. 

The Anna Maria Amcats women's ice hockey program of Anna Maria College in Paxton, Massachusetts has participated in the NCAA Division III as an independent team (ie. without conference affiliation) since the 2018–19 season.

Colonial Hockey Conference 
The Colonial Hockey Conference (CHC; previously ECAC North Atlantic) is a women's ice hockey-only conference which operates in New England. As of the 2019–20 season, there are five member programs:

 Becker College (Hawks) – Worcester, Massachusetts
 Endicott College (Gulls) – Beverly, Massachusetts
 Nichols College (Bison) – Dudley, Massachusetts
 Salve Regina University (Seahawks) – Newport, Rhode Island
 University of New England (Nor'easters) – Biddeford, Maine

Minnesota Intercollegiate Athletic Conference  
The Minnesota Intercollegiate Athletic Conference (MIAC) is a college athletic conference located in Minnesota. The women's ice hockey programs that compete in the MIAC include:

 Augsburg University (Auggies) – Minneapolis, Minnesota
 Bethel University (Royals) – St. Paul, Minnesota
 College of Saint Benedict (Bennies) – St. Joseph, Minnesota
 Concordia College (Cobbers) – Moorhead, Minnesota
 Gustavus Adolphus College (Gusties) – St. Peter, Minnesota
 Hamline University (Pipers) – St. Paul, Minnesota
 Saint Mary’s University (Cardinals) – Winona, Minnesota
 St. Catherine University (Wildcats) – St. Paul, Minnesota
 St. Olaf College (Oles) – Northfield, Minnesota
 College of St. Scholastica (Saints) – Duluth, Minnesota

The most recent change to the MIAC membership came after the 2020–21 season, when St. Thomas was expelled from the league and moved to NCAA Division I, joining the Summit League for most sports and the Western Collegiate Hockey Association (WHCA) in women's ice hockey. St. Thomas was replaced by St. Scholastica.

New England Hockey Conference 
The New England Hockey Conference (NEHC; previously ECAC East) is an ice hockey-only conference which operates in New England. As of the 2019–20 season, there are nine member programs in the women's division: 

 Castleton University (Spartans) – Castleton, Vermont
 Johnson & Wales University (Wildcats) – Providence, Rhode Island
 New England College (Pilgrims) – Henniker, New Hampshire
 Norwich University (Cadets) – Northfield, Vermont
 Plymouth State University (Panthers) – Plymouth, New Hampshire
Salem State University (Vikings) – Salem, Massachusetts
Suffolk University (Rams) – Boston, Massachusetts
University of Massachusetts Boston (Beacons) – Boston, Massachusetts
 University of Southern Maine (Huskies) – Gorham, Maine

New England Small College Athletic Conference 
The New England Small College Athletic Conference (NESCAC) is a college athletic conference of liberal arts colleges and universities located in New England and New York. The member schools of the NESCAC are often referred to as the “Little Ivies.” The women's ice hockey programs competing in the NESCAC are:

 Amherst College (Mammoths) – Amherst, Massachusetts
 Bowdoin College (Polar Bears) – Brunswick, Maine
 Colby College (Mules) – Waterville, Maine
 Connecticut College (Camels) – New London, Connecticut
 Hamilton College (Continentals) – Clinton, New York
 Middlebury College (Panthers) – Middlebury, Vermont
 Trinity College (Bantams) – Hartford, Connecticut
 Wesleyan University (Cardinals) – Middletown, Connecticut
 Williams College (Ephs) – Williamstown, Massachusetts

Northeast Women's Hockey League 
The Northeast Women's Hockey League (NEWHL; successor of ECAC West) is a women's ice hockey-only conference comprising seven member schools in New York. It was founded in 2017 by the women's ice hockey teams of five schools in the State University of New York Athletic Conference (SUNYAC); its membership was increased to seven programs in 2019–20. The programs competing in the NEWHL are:

 Buffalo State College (Bengals) – Buffalo, New York
 Morrisville State College (Mustangs) – Morrisville, New York
 State University of New York at Canton (Roos) – Canton, New York
 State University of New York College at Cortland (Red Dragons) – Cortland, New York
 State University of New York at Oswego (Lakers) – Oswego, New York
 State University of New York at Plattsburgh (Cardinals) – Plattsburgh, New York
 State University of New York at Potsdam (Bears) – Potsdam, New York

Northern Collegiate Hockey Association 
The Northern Collegiate Hockey Association (NCHA) is a hockey-only conference, which operates in Illinois, Indiana, Michigan, and Wisconsin. The women's programs competing in the NCHA are:

 Adrian College (Bulldogs) – Adrian, Michigan
 Aurora University (Spartans) – Aurora, Illinois
 Concordia University Wisconsin (Falcons) – Mequon, Wisconsin
 Finlandia University (Lions) – Hancock, Michigan
 Lake Forest College (Foresters) – Lake Forest, Illinois
 Marian University (Sabres) – Fond du Lac, Wisconsin
 St. Norbert College (Green Knights) – De Pere, Wisconsin
 Trine University (Thunder) – Angola, Indiana

United Collegiate Hockey Conference 
The United Collegiate Hockey Conference (UCHC) is a hockey-only conference which operates in the Mid-Atlantic region. The women's programs competing in the UCHC are:

 Alvernia University (Golden Wolves) – Reading, Pennsylvania
 Chatham University (Cougars) – Pittsburgh, Pennsylvania
 Elmira College (Soaring Eagles) – Elmira, New York
 King's College (Monarchs) – Wilkes-Barre, Pennsylvania
 Lebanon Valley College (Flying Dutchman) – Annville, Pennsylvania
 Manhattanville College (Valiants) – Purchase, New York
 Nazareth College (Golden Flyers) – Rochester, New York
 Neumann University (Knights) – Aston, Pennsylvania
 Stevenson University (Mustangs) – Stevenson, Maryland
 Utica College (Pioneers) – Utica, New York
 Wilkes University (Colonels) – Wilkes-Barre, Pennsylvania
 William Smith College (Herons) – Geneva, New York

Wisconsin Intercollegiate Athletic Conference 
The Wisconsin Intercollegiate Athletic Conference (WIAC) is a collegiate athletics conference in Wisconsin, primarily comprising institutions in the University of Wisconsin System. The women's ice hockey programs participating in the WIAC are:

Northland College (LumberJills) – Ashland, Wisconsin
University of Wisconsin–Eau Claire (Bluegolds) – Eau Claire, Wisconsin
 University of Wisconsin–River Falls (Falcons) – River Falls, Wisconsin
 University of Wisconsin–Stevens Point (Pointers) – Stevens Point, Wisconsin
 University of Wisconsin–Superior (Yellowjackets) – Superior, Wisconsin

List of champions

Laura Hurd Award

The Laura Hurd Award is an annual award given to the top player in NCAA Division III Women's Ice Hockey as awarded by the American Hockey Coaches Association (AHCA). Since 2007, it has been named after Laura Hurd, a stand-out player for Elmira College who was killed in a car accident. Previously, it was known as the Division III Women’s Player of the Year Award.

Award winners

See also

NCAA Division I Women's Hockey conferences and teams
National Collegiate women's ice hockey championship
Women's Hockey Coaches with 250 wins
Major women's sport leagues in North America
Title IX

References

External links
  NCAA Division III women ice hockey page

 
 
4